Dłużek  is a village in the administrative district of Gmina Lubsko, within Żary County, Lubusz Voivodeship, in western Poland.

The village has a population of 347.

Notable residents
 Ernst Gunther, Duke of Schleswig-Holstein (1863-1921) 
 Augusta Victoria of Schleswig-Holstein (1858-1921), last German Empress

References

Villages in Żary County